Local elections were held in Albania on 21 June 2015. Voters elected mayors, municipal council members, municipal unit mayors and municipal unit members. The Central Election Commission of Albania was responsible for administrating the elections. This provided that the community type of komuna is abolished and at the same time the total number of communities were reduced from 373 to 61 Bashkia. Those entitled to vote elected the executive and legislative representatives of their communities, the 61 mayors (and on the other hand the total of 1595 municipal councils.

Background 
Following the elections in 2011. The Democrats won in many rural areas as well as Tirana by 81 votes. At the Time Edi Rama was the longest Serving Mayor of Tirana serving 11 years. Lulzim Basha in 2015 announced he would not seek reelection for mayor of Tirana. Lulzim Basha prior to the election announced that Halim Kosova would be elected to run as Mayor of Tirana for the Democratic Party of Albania. Minister of Social Welfare and Youth at the time Erion Veliaj had announced he would run to become Mayor of Tirana.

Parties and Coalitions 
Following Sali Berisha's Resignation during the election loss in 2013. Lulzim Basha was elected leader of the Democratic Party of Albania. Basha would become the leader of the opposition up until 2021 when Berisha and Basha began disputing over the party leadership. Basha would announce in 2015 that he would not seek a second term as mayor of Tirana. There would be two alliances as usual in previous elections Local and Parliamentary. The Alliance for a European Albania (ASHE) led by Prime Minister Edi Rama and the People's Alliance for Work and Dignity (APPD) lead by Opposition leader Lulzim Basha.

Results 
The Alliance for a European Albania would win without any trouble in most areas in Albania. Winning Tirana by large Margin and Erion Veliaj officially becoming Mayor of Tirana. This would be Lulzim Basha's first time being the leader of the opposition of Albania other then Sali Berisha. Basha's People's Alliance for Work and Dignity was only able to win 13/61 municipalities. It was considered a humiliating loss for the Democratic Party of Albania and its alliance.  ASHE won 45 municipalities, including the larger cities, especially in the south of the country, such as Durrës, Elbasan, Vlora, Korça, Gjirokastra, Fier and Sarande. In non-coalition parties, the Ethnic Greek Minority for the future (MEGA) in Finiq the choice. ASHE was seen as the winner of the local elections. The mayors who won as well votes are as shown below:

Council seat election results 
ASHE alliance held the majority in many Municipal councils as shown:

References

External links
Central Elections Commissions

2015 elections in Europe
2015
Partial local elections
June 2015 events in Europe